Suddenly is the fifth studio album by British recording artist Billy Ocean, released in 1984. It featured his first major U.S. pop hit single "Caribbean Queen (No More Love on the Run)", which reached #1 on the Billboard Hot 100 record chart. Prior to that, his biggest success in the U.S. charts had been a #22 placing for "Love Really Hurts Without You" in 1976, which was one of a number of British hits he had achieved by the release of this album. Despite these earlier hits, Suddenly became Ocean's first charting album in the UK, reaching #9 on the UK Album Chart. It also reached #9 in the US, and produced two additional US Top Five singles in the title track and "Loverboy", while a fourth single, "Mystery Lady", reached the US Top Forty. "Caribbean Queen" and "Suddenly" were also top ten hits on the UK Singles Chart.

Track listing
All songs written by Keith Diamond and Billy Ocean, except where noted.
 "Caribbean Queen (No More Love on the Run)" - 7:52
 "Mystery Lady" (Diamond, Ocean, James Woodley) - 5:02
 "Syncopation" (Diamond, Ocean, Jolyon Skinner) - 5:20
 "The Long and Winding Road" (John Lennon, Paul McCartney) - 4:40
 "Loverboy" (Diamond, Ocean, Robert Lange) - 5:16
 "Lucky Man" - 4:21
 "Dancefloor" (Diamond, Ocean, Barry J. Eastmond) - 4:14
 "If I Should Lose You" - 3:59
 "Suddenly" - 3:53

On the European release, the first track was "European Queen (No More Love on the Run)" (4:50), replacing "Caribbean Queen". On the UK Jive release (HIP 12) the track length was given (and measured) as 7:52 and titled "Caribbean Queen (No More Love on the Run)".

Expanded edition (released July 2011)
Bonus Tracks:
"Caribbean Queen (No More Love on the Run)" (Extended mix) - 8:16
"Lucky Man" (Extended version) - 6:07
"Mystery Lady" (Extended version) - 6:49
"Loverboy" (Extended club mix) - 8:08

Personnel 
 Billy Ocean – lead and backing vocals, Simmons drums, LinnDrum 
 Barry J. Eastmond – keyboards, synthesizers, string arrangements
 Keith Diamond – synth bass, Simmons drums, LinnDrum, backing vocals 
 Clarence "Binky" Brice – guitar 
 Vic Linton – guitar 
 Eddie Martinez – guitar 
 Geoff Whitehorn – guitar 
 Timmy Allen – bass guitar 
 Terry Silverlight – drums (4, 9)
 Tony Maroni – percussion
 Andy Newton – percussion 
 V. Jeffrey Smith – saxophone 
 Chrissie Faith – backing vocals 
 Lisa Fischer – backing vocals 
 Katie Kissoon – backing vocals 
 Curtis King – backing vocals 
 Stevie Lange – backing vocals 
 Cindy Mizelle – backing vocals 
 Meekaeel Muhammad – backing vocals

Production 
 Producer – Keith Diamond
 Engineers – Steve Goldman, Bryan "Chuck" New and Pete Robbins.
 Mixing – Keith Diamond and Bryan "Chuck" New
 Art Direction and Design – Donn Davenport
 Cover Illustration – Linda Fennimore
 Photography – Michael Hoppen

Charts

Certifications

Singles

References

Billy Ocean albums
1984 albums
Post-disco albums
Jive Records albums
Arista Records albums
Albums recorded at Morgan Sound Studios